Phaneromyces is a genus of lichen-forming fungi in the monotypic family  Phaneromycetaceae  (order Ostropales). Phaneromyces consists of two species known from temperate South America.

References

Ostropales genera
Ostropales
Lichen genera
Taxa described in 1889
Taxa named by Carlo Luigi Spegazzini